Anolis toldo, the gray-banded green anole, is a species of lizard in the family Dactyloidae. The species is found in Cuba.

References

Anoles
Reptiles described in 2000
Endemic fauna of Cuba
Reptiles of Cuba
Taxa named by Orlando H. Garrido